Wolfgang Herrndorf (12 June 1965 in Hamburg – 26 August 2013 in Berlin) was a German author, painter, and illustrator.

Life and career
In 2002, his debut novel In Plüschgewittern was published by Zweitausendeins. Despite the protagonist's age of approximately 30 years, Herrndorf describes the novel as youth novel. Critics described the novel as popular literature, a reworked version of In Plüschgewittern was republished by Rowohlt in 2008. A collection of interconnected short stories by Herrndorf was published by Eichborn Verlag under the title of Diesseits des Van-Allen-Gürtels in 2007; A fictional interview between Herrndorf and an untrustworthy Cosmonaut, which contained many elements from science-fiction, was released the same year, by SuKuLTuR-Verlag. Unreliable narrators are a recurring element in Herrndorf's fiction, which is attributed to the influence of Vladimir Nabokov.

His critically and commercially biggest success was the novel Tschick (published as Why We Took the Car in English), a bildungsroman about two fourteen-year-old boys. The book was featured on the German list of bestselling books for over a year. He published his next novel Sand in November 2011. The novel contains elements of crime fiction, society novels and historical novels. Herrndorf quipped, the novel could belong to the genre of the "Trottelroman" (idiot novel). Sand won the Leipzig Book Fair Prize in 2012, ‘’Tschick’’ was nominated for the same prize the year before. Herrndorf's friend Robert Koall accepted the prize in Herrndorf's stead. Sand also made it to the shortlist of the German Book Prize.

Herrndorf, who lived in Berlin, regularly wrote in the web forum "Wir höflichen Paparazzi" (German web forum that reports about random encounters with celebrities), which is acknowledged to have had a strong influence on Herrndorf and worked as a space for resonance. He also participated with contributions for the web blog "Riesenmaschine" (German collaborative blog). He was a member of the national authors football team "Autonama". After being diagnosed with a malignant brain tumour (glioblastoma) in February 2010, he began a digital diary called "das Blog Arbeit und Struktur" (the blog Work and Structure) in which he reports about his deadly illness. It was posthumously published in December 2013 by Rowohlt in book form, as the author had requested.

On 26 August 2013 Herrndorf committed suicide in Berlin. He was interred at the Dorotheenstadt cemetery in Berlin. In 2014 Rowohlt published the sequel of Tschick from Isa's point of view as an unfinished novel with the title Bilder deiner großen Liebe (Pictures Of Your True Love). The epilogue by Kathrin Passig and Marcus Gärtner states that Herrndorf himself approved the release and determined the title. The book was first performed as a play in 2015 at the Staatsschauspiel Dresden, directed by Jan Gehlers.

Bibliography

Novels
 2002 – In Plüschgewittern
 2010 – Tschick
 2011 – Sand
 2014 – Bilder deiner großen Liebe – unfinished

Nonfiction
 2013 – Arbeit und Struktur

Other works 
 1998 – with Jürgen Roth: Heribert Faßbender – Gesammelte Werke. Band IX/5: Europameisterschaft 1996, Italien–Deutschland. (As Editor)
 2007 – Diesseits des Van-Allen-Gürtels (A collection of six short stories)
 2007 – Die Rosenbaum-Doktrin (A fictional interview. Published in Schöner Lesen, Issue #64)
 2018: Stimmen. Texte, die bleiben sollten (A collection of literary texts written between 2001 and 2010.)

Exhibitions

2017: Das unbekannte Kapitel. Wolfgang Herrndorfs Bilder. Kunsthaus Stade, June – October 2017
2015: Wolfgang Herrndorf: Bilder. Literaturhaus Berlin, June – September 2015
2016: „Zitate" – Bilder von Wolfgang Herrndorf. Literaturhaus Munich, July – September 2016

Awards
2008 – Deutscher Erzählerpreis für Diesseits des Van-Allen-Gürtels
2011 – Leipzig Book Fair Prize (Category: Fiction) für Why We Took the Car (Nominated)
2011 – Clemens-Brentano-Preis für Why We Took the Car
2011 – Deutscher Jugendliteraturpreis für Why We Took the Car
2012 – Hans Fallada Prize
2012 – Leipzig Book Fair Prize (Category: Fiction) für Sand 
2012 – Literaturpreis des Kulturkreises der deutschen Wirtschaft

External links

 
 Arbeit und Struktur, Wolfgang Herrndorf's Blog (in German)
 Herrndorf's Posts in the Weblog Riesenmaschiene (in German)
 Bestsellerautor Wolfgang Herrndorf mit 48 Jahren gestorben, Der Tagesspiegel, 27. August 2013. (in German)
 Fokke Joel: Schreiben gegen das Ende, Die Zeit, 27. August 2013. (in German)
 Holm Friebe: Aus der Welt gefallen, Welt am Sonntag, 1. September 2013. (in German)
 Podcast of the Bayrischer Rundfunk (20min) (in German)
 Tillmann Prüfer: Unknown Pictures (text in German)

1965 births
2013 deaths
German male writers
Artists from Berlin
German caricaturists
Suicides by firearm in Germany
Artists who committed suicide